Bleak may refer to:

Fish
 Species of the genus Alburnus
 Alburnoides bipunctatus, also known as the schneider

Music
 "Bleak", a song by Opeth from Blackwater Park
 "Bleak", a song by Soulfly from Dark Ages

Other uses
 Bleak, Virginia, a community in the U.S.
 David B. Bleak, decorated US soldier of the Korean War

See also
 Bleek (disambiguation)